ISBM University  is a private university located in Chhura, Gariaband, Chhattisgarh, India. ISBM University was established in 2016 by Alpha Foundation through Chhattisgarh Private Universities (Establishment and Operation) (Amendment) Act, 2016. It has won the "Best Upcoming University" award for 2017, presented by the Minister of Human Resource Development Prakash Javadekar in association with ASSOCHAM. The Chancellor of the university is Vinay Agrawal.

Schools
The university comprises the following schools:
 School of Arts and Humanities
 School of Commerce
 School of Design
 School of Engineering and Technology
 School of Information and Technology
 School of Journalism and Mass Communication
 School of Law
 School of Library and Information Science
 School of Life Science
 School of Management
 School of Pharmacy
 School of Science
 School of Yoga and Naturopathy

References

External links

Universities in Chhattisgarh
Gariaband district
Educational institutions established in 2016
2016 establishments in Chhattisgarh
Private universities in India